Ranajoy Bhattacharjee, is an Indian music composer, singer, music producer and lyricist hailing from Kolkata, India who is known for his Preme Pora Baron from the feature film Sweater, Mon Kyamoner Jonmodin from the feature film Hridpindo and Geetabitaner Dibyi from the feature film Kolkata Chalantika. & more.

Early life

Ranajoy had always been musically inclined.  He took a formal training in Indian Classical Vocal Music, Nazrul Geeti and Western Classical Piano. He was primarily driven to acquire degrees in statistics and computer science and then a job in the IT industry. However, he soon left the job and moved to Mumbai in 2014 to pursue full time music.

Discography

Films

Web series

Tele Film

Short Film

Tv Serials

Documentary

Advertisement/TVC/Brand

Awards

Filmfare Awards:
Best Music Album – Sweater 
Best Lyrics – Preme Pora Baron

Mirchi Music Awards:
Film Song of the Year – Preme Pora Baron 
Film Album of the Year: Sweater
Film Music Composer of the Year- for Preme Pora Baron
Film Lyricist of the Year: for Preme Pora Baron
Upcoming Male Vocalist of the Year – for Preme Pora Baron
Upcoming Music Composer of the Year – for Preme Pora Baron
Upcoming Lyricist of the Year – for Preme Pora Baron

Tele Cine Awards:
Best Lyrics – for Preme Pora Baron

Film and Frame Digital Film Awards:
Best Lyrics – for Preme Pora Baron

References

Year of birth missing (living people)
Living people